KT Freetel Co., Ltd. (Korea Telecom Freetel) was a South Korean telecommunications firm, now merged into Korea Telecom, specializing in cellular, or mobile, phones. Since 1999, it has also developed extensive overseas operations. The company is credited with developing customized ring back tones. On 1 June 2009, KTF was merged with KT.

In 2003, KTF received an order from PT Mobile-8 Telecom of Indonesia for a comprehensive consulting service. KTF also signed a contract for the export of its CDMA network management system and invested $10 million in the Indonesian mobile provider.

KTF commercialized the world first nationwide HSDPA service with the brand of "SHOW" on 1 March 2007.

In India, the firm completed the first stage of its contract with Reliance for $2.65 million worth of the CDMA network construction.

KTF also holds a 25% stake in CEC Mobile of China, after investing a sum of 4.5 billion won in 2002. The two major shareholders of KTF are KT(52.99%) and NTT DoCoMo (10.03%). KTF sponsors a professional StarCraft team.

Merged into KT 

KT officially declared the merger on January 14 2009. KFTC approved merge on February 25, 2009. The Korea Communications Commission finally approved the merger on Mar 18 2009.

A special meeting of shareholders was held on Mar 27 2009. KT finished the merge on May 31, 2009.

See also
List of South Korean companies
List of telephone operating companies
Economy of South Korea
SK Telecom
LG Telecom
KT
U Mobile

Members of the Conexus Mobile Alliance
KT Group